Moschidae is a family of pecoran even-toed ungulates, containing the musk deer (Moschus) and its extinct relatives. They are characterized by long 'saber teeth' instead of horns, antlers or ossicones, modest size (Moschus only reaches ; other taxa were even smaller) and a lack of facial glands. The fossil record of the family extends back to the late Oligocene, around 28 million years ago. The group was abundant across Eurasia and North America during the Miocene, but afterwards declined to only the extant genus Moschus by the early Pleistocene.

Taxonomy and classification
Until the beginning of the 21st century it was understood that the family Moschidae (musk deer) was sister to Cervidae. However, a 2003 phylogenetic study by Alexandre Hassanin (of National Museum of Natural History, France) and colleagues, based on mitochondrial and nuclear analyses, revealed that Moschidae and Bovidae form a clade sister to Cervidae. According to the study, Cervidae diverged from the Bovidae-Moschidae clade 27 to 28 million years ago. The following cladogram is based on the 2003 study.

After Prothero (2007)

Family Moschidae

References

Mammal families
Taxa named by John Edward Gray
Musk deer